Maria Sajdak (born 30 July 1991) is a Polish national representative rower, an Olympian and a world champion. She is a reigning world champion in the women's quad scull winning her title at the 2018 World Rowing Championships in Plovdiv. She competed in the women's quadruple sculls event at the 2016 Summer Olympics where she won a bronze medal.

References

External links

1991 births
Living people
Polish female rowers
Olympic rowers of Poland
Rowers at the 2016 Summer Olympics
Rowers at the 2020 Summer Olympics
Sportspeople from Kraków
Medalists at the 2016 Summer Olympics
Medalists at the 2020 Summer Olympics
Olympic silver medalists for Poland
Olympic bronze medalists for Poland
Olympic medalists in rowing
World Rowing Championships medalists for Poland